Saul Malatrasi (born 17 February 1938) is a former Italian football player and coach who played as a defender for Inter Milan and A.C. Milan and was part of their European Cup victories in 1965 and 1969 respectively, thus becoming the first player to participate in the European Cup campaigns of two different winning teams. Malatrasi played in the 1969 final, but not in the 1965 final.

He earned three caps for the Italy national football team.

He played for 12 seasons (247 games, 3 goals) in the Serie A for SPAL 1907, Fiorentina, Roma, Internazionale, Lecco and Milan, winning at least one trophy for four of these teams (except for SPAL and Lecco).

Honours
Fiorentina
 Coppa Italia: 1960–61
 European Cup Winners' Cup: 1960–61

Roma
 Coppa Italia: 1963–64

Inter
 Serie A: 1964–65, 1965–66
 European Cup: 1964–65
 Intercontinental Cup: 1964, 1965

Milan
 Serie A: 1967–68
 European Cup: 1968–69
 European Cup Winners' Cup: 1967–68
 Intercontinental Cup: 1969

References

External links
 

1938 births
Living people
Sportspeople from the Province of Rovigo
Italian footballers
Italy international footballers
Serie A players
S.P.A.L. players
ACF Fiorentina players
A.S. Roma players
Inter Milan players
Calcio Lecco 1912 players
A.C. Milan players
Aurora Pro Patria 1919 players
Italian football managers
Delfino Pescara 1936 managers
Association football defenders
UEFA Champions League winning players
Footballers from Veneto